RFA Wave Emperor  (A 100) was a Wave-class oiler of the Royal Fleet Auxiliary built at Haverton Hill by the Furness Shipbuilding Company.

External links
Wave Class Oilers - website on Oilers by Jeremy Olver.

Wave-class oilers
Tankers of the Royal Fleet Auxiliary
1944 ships
Ships built on the River Tees